Tadeusz Szeligowski Poznań Philharmonic is a regional cultural institution founded in 1947 on the initiative of Tadeusz Szeligowski as the State Philharmonic in Poznań; one of the two philharmonics in the Greater Poland Voivodeship.

History

The inauguration of the Philharmonic's activities took place on 10 November 1947 under the direction of Stanisław Wisłocki. Since March 1950, the Poznań Nightingales Choir, headed by Stefan Stuligrosz, has been operating at the Philharmonic. The Philharmonic is connected with Polish contemporary music festivals "Poznań Spring", another initiative of Szeligowski.

The concert hall of the Philharmonic is the Hall of the Adam Mickiewicz University, considered to be one of the best in terms of acoustics in Poland. 

Over the years, the philharmonic orchestra has been led by Jerzy Katlewicz, Robert Satanowski, Witold Krzemieński, Zdzisław Szostak, Renard Czajkowski, Wojciech Rajski, Wojciech Michniewski, Andrzej Borejko, Mirosław Jacek Błaszczyk, José Maria Florêncio, Grzegorz Nowak.

The ensemble  performed with many outstanding conductors and soloists, among others: Hermann Abendroth, Stanisław Skrowaczewski, Roberto Benzi, Carlo Zecchi and Artur Rubinstein, Mstisław Rostropowicz, Martha Argerich, Henryk Szeryng,  Dawid Ojstrach, Światosław Richter, Malcolm Frager, Monique Haas, Jean Fournier, Narciso Yepes, Gidon Kremer, Maurizio Pollini, Krystian Zimerman, Garrick Ohlsson, Stefania Toczyska, Ewa Podleś, Joanna Kozłowska, Ryszard Karczykowski, Wiesław Ochman, Wojciech Drabowicz, Robert McDuffie, Nikolaj Znaider.

Directors
Directors/conductors of the Poznań Philharmonic Symphony Orchestra (chronologically):
 Stanisław Wisłocki
 Jerzy Katlewicz
 Robert Satanowski
 Witold Krzemieński
 Zdzisław Szostak
 Renard Czajkowski
 Wojciech Rajski
 Wojciech Michniewski
 Andrey Boreyko
 Mirosław Jacek Błaszczyk
 José Maria Florêncio

See also
List of concert halls in Poland

References

External links

 

Concert halls in Poland
1947 establishments in Poland
Music venues completed in 1947
Tourist attractions in Poznań
Polish orchestras
Symphony orchestras
Music venues completed in 1910